Radio Fiji Two  is a Hindi language - public service broadcaster in Fiji. The station broadcasts on the 105 frequency to the cities of Suva, Navua, Nausori, Labasa, Savusavu, Nadi, Denarau, Mamanuca and Lautoka. The station also broadcasts on the 104.8 frequency to the towns of Coral Coast and Ba. The station broadcasts on 105.2 megahertz to the town of Tavua, and on 105.4megahertz to Rakiraki and Nabouwalu.

It is operated by Fiji Broadcasting Corporation, the company which also owns FBC TV, Radio Fiji One, Mirchi FM, Bula FM, 2day FM-Fiji, and Gold FM-Fiji in Fiji.

Radio Fiji Two initiated its broadcasting on 1 July 1954. Featuring Multi Lingual Religious Music in the morning, News & community Messages, Drive time music play, talk back shows, Birthday Announcements, Interviews, Favorite music plays and much more. Featuring a range of popular Hindi songs from the 1950s to present era. This includes film songs and music as well as recordings of popular artists and latest hits.

The station endeavors to entertain, educate, inform, preserve & develop culture and foster mutual understanding between the different originating groups in the Fijian Community, using the universal language of music, news, views, information and being mindful of the diverse interests, religious and ethnic origins of the audience they cater. The programs include substantial local contents specialized contributors dealing with wide range of cultural issues.  Featuring regular news and sports bulletins, interviews and discussions on issues of concern and interest of the Indo- Fijian (Indian) community.

The programs are sponsored by the government under the Public Service Broadcast (PSB) contract, from private organizations and religious organizations in Fiji. Radio Fiji Two provides opportunities to local businesses to market their products to a specialized niche market by advertising on air.

Announcers
Radio Fiji Two's lineup is as follows
 Subha Ki Manzil 12.00am - 6am: Sheenam Roy
 Humsafar 6.00am - 9am: Dipti Ben and Monish Sharma
 Ghar Sansaar  9am - 12pm: Pallavi Sheweta 
 Suhana Safar 12pm - 3pm: Noor Jahan
 Mastaani Shaam 3pm - 7pm: Sonam Lata
 Mahekti Ratein 7pm - 12am: Ravin Singh
 Guldasta  (Saturday) 6am -12pm: Sheenam Roy
 Mastana Bahar (Saturday) 6pm - 12am: Rajnesh Kumar
 Aaina "Talk Back Show" (Tuesday) 2pm - 3pm : Shammi Lochan Lal
 Bhuli Hui Yaadein (Sunday) 6pm - 12am: Gyan Prabha Nand
Pallavi Sheweta is the station's current Program Director.

Former Radio Jockeys
Some of the famous radio jockey that have worked with Radio Fiji 2;
 Late Ambika Nand
 Late Shri Dewakar Prasad
 Late Shri Sami Mudaliar
 Late Shri Puran Ji Charan
 Late Shri Odho Ji Bhai
 Jagdish Maharaj
 Jitendra Shyam
 Nitya Nand
 Dharmendra Shyam
 Sashi Kanta
 Ranjana Kumar
 Prem Chand
 Pranil Chand
 Yashmin Ali
 Veena Kumar Bhatnagar
 Roneel Narayan
 Jeff Khan
 Prabha Mishra
 Pawan Rekha
 Rohit Ritesh Sharma
 Late Sunil Raj
 Pronol Rae
 Mohini Karan
 Tej Ram Prem 
 Avinesh Raj
 Late Anirudh Diwakar
 Vijay Dutt Sharma
 Vandhana Prasad
 Sherine Prasad
 Late Ramesh Chandra
 Yashmin Ali
 Mohini
 Late Vidyawati Jairam

References 

Hindi-language radio stations
Radio stations in Fiji
Hindi Radio in Fiji